Family Life Radio is a network of Christian radio stations in the United States, broadcasting Contemporary Christian music, as well as some Christian talk and teaching.

Christian Talk and Teaching shows heard on Family Life Radio include: Intentional Living with Dr. Randy Carlson, Focus on the Family, Turning Point with David Jeremiah, and In Touch with Charles Stanley.

Stations
Family Life Radio is currently heard on 40 radio stations, with stations in Arizona, California, Colorado, Florida, Georgia, Kansas, Michigan, New Mexico, Tennessee, Texas, and Wisconsin.

References

External links
 Family Life Radio's official website
 Family Life Radio's webcast

Christian radio stations in the United States
American radio networks
Organizations based in Tucson, Arizona
Non-profit organizations based in Arizona
Family Life Radio stations
Radio broadcasting companies of the United States
1966 establishments in Michigan